Compton is a prominent lunar impact crater that is located in the northern hemisphere on the far side of the Moon. It lies to the east of the Mare Humboldtianum, and southwest of the walled plain Schwarzschild. To the southeast of Compton is the heavily eroded crater Swann.

This formation is roughly circular, with a wide, irregular outer rim that varies considerably in width. Parts of the inner wall have terraced steps that form wide shelves along the edge. Within the wall is a floor that has been resurfaced by lava flows some time in the past. This surface has a lower albedo than the surroundings, giving it a slightly darker hue.

At the midpoint of the floor is a formation of mounts that comprise the central peak. This peak is surrounded by a semi-circular ring of hills that lie in the western half of the crater at a radius about half that of the inner edge of the rim. These mounts form jagged rises through the lava-covered surface and lie at irregular intervals from each other.

The interior also contains a set of slender rilles within the ring of hills, primarily in the northwest part of the crater floor. Apart from a small, bowl-shaped craterlet near the eastern rim, the floor only contains a few tiny craterlets.

Satellite craters
By convention these features are identified on lunar maps by placing the letter on the side of the crater midpoint that is closest to Compton.

References

 
 
 
 
 
 
 
 
 
 
 
 

Impact craters on the Moon